Semioscopis inornata, the dull flatbody moth, is a species of moth of the family Depressariidae. It was described by Walsingham in 1882. It is found throughout Canada and northern United States.

The length of the forewings is 10.5–15 mm. The forewings are bluish-gray. Adults are on wing from early April to the end of May in one generation per year.

The larvae feed on Populus tremuloides, Populus grandidentata, Populus balsamifera and Salix species. They roll the leaves of their host plant.

References

Moths described in 1882
Semioscopis